The Men's 10,000 metres event featured at the 1995 World Championships in Gothenburg, Sweden. There were a total number of 41 participating athletes, with two qualifying heats and the final was held on 8 August 1995.

Final

Qualifying heats
Held on Saturday 1995-08-05

See also
 1993 Men's World Championships 10.000 metres
 1996 Men's Olympic 10.000 metres
 1997 Men's World Championships 10.000 metres

References
 Results

 
10,000 metres at the World Athletics Championships